Stefan Wierzbowski (born 1620 in Siradien) was a Polish clergyman and bishop for the Roman Catholic Diocese of Poznań. He became ordained in 1663. He was appointed bishop in 1664. He died in 1687.

References

17th-century Roman Catholic bishops in the Polish–Lithuanian Commonwealth
1620 births
1687 deaths
Bishops of Poznań